Jean Leniol Jeudy (born 1958) is one of three members of the New Hampshire House of Representatives for Hillsborough 10 (Ward 3 in Manchester).

Early life
Jeudy was born in Jérémie, Haiti, in 1958. In 1981, he went on vacation to the United States. He admired the political freedom of that country so much that he emigrated two years later, moving to New Hampshire. He gained his American citizenship in 1995.

Entry Into Politics
After a debilitating back injury in 1993, Jeudy became inspired to give back to his adopted community. He created the Manchester Haitian Community Center and served on the Board of Directors for the local United Way, as well as for the Manchester Public-access television station.

In 2004, he decided to run for State Representative and finished 5th in the Democratic Primary, 53 votes short of Manchester Firefighters Union president William Clayton. However, after the resignation of Clayton in 2005, Jeudy ran again, defeating Republican opponent, Robert Fremeau, 508 to 322. Jeudy become the first Haitian-American legislator in New Hampshire history.

References

External links
Interview in the Hippopress

1958 births
American politicians of Haitian descent
Haitian emigrants to the United States
Living people
Democratic Party members of the New Hampshire House of Representatives
21st-century American politicians